Mixes Food Creek is a stream in the U.S. state of South Dakota.

Mixes Food Creek takes its name from Mixes Food, a Sioux Indian who settled there.

See also
List of rivers of South Dakota

References

Rivers of Pennington County, South Dakota
Rivers of South Dakota